This is a list of Maltese football transfers for the 2013–14 summer transfer window by club. Only transfers of clubs in the Maltese Premier League and Maltese First Division are included.

The summer transfer window opened on 1 July 2013, although a few transfers may take place prior to that date. The window closed at midnight on 31 August 2013. Players without a club may join one at any time, either during or in between transfer windows.

Maltese Premier League

Balzan

In:

 
 
 

 
 
 

Out:

Birkirkara

In:

 
 
 
 
 

Out:

Floriana

In:

 
 

Out:

Hibernians

In:

Out:

Mosta

In:

 

Out:

Naxxar Lions

In:

 
 

Out:

Qormi

In:

 
 

Out:

Rabat Ajax

In:

Out:

Sliema Wanderers

In:

Out:

Tarxien Rainbows

In:

Out:

Valletta

In:

Out:

Vittoriosa Stars

In:

 
 
 

Out:

Maltese First Division

Birzebbuga St.Peters

In:

Out:

Gudja United

In:

Out:

Gżira United

In:

 

Out:

Ħamrun Spartans

In:

Out:

Lija Athletic

In:

Out:

Marsaxlokk

In:

Out:

Melita

In:

Out:

Msida Saint-Joseph

In:

Out:

Pietà Hotspurs

In:

 
 
 

Out:

St. Andrews

In:

 

Out:

St. George's

In:

Out:

Zebbug Rangers

In:

Out:

Z

In:

Out:

See also
 List of Bulgarian football transfers summer 2013
 List of Dutch football transfers summer 2013
 List of English football transfers summer 2013
 List of French football transfers summer 2013
 List of German football transfers summer 2013
 List of Italian football transfers summer 2013
 List of Portuguese football transfers summer 2013
 List of Spanish football transfers summer 2013
 List of Swedish football transfers summer 2013

References

External links
 Official Website

Maltese
Transfers
2013